Pedro Téllez-Girón, 3rd Duke of Osuna (17 February 1574 – 20 September 1624) was a Spanish nobleman and politician. He was the 2nd Marquis of Peñafiel, 7th Count of Ureña, Spanish Viceroy of Sicily (1611–1616), Viceroy of Naples (1616–1620), a Knight of the Order of the Golden Fleece since 1608, Grandee of Spain, member of the Spanish Supreme Council of War, and the subject of several poems by his friend, counselor and assistant, Francisco de Quevedo.

Early life
He was born in Osuna, province of Sevilla, and baptized on 18 January 1575, the son of Juan Téllez-Girón, 2nd Duke of Osuna, and of his wife Ana María de Velasco, daughter of Íñigo Fernández de Velasco, 4th Duke of Frías and Constable of Castile.

According to the first biography published in 1699 by the Protestant Milanese Gregorio Leti, which has been until the 20th century the main and most exploited source of information on the third Duke of Osuna, when a boy he accompanied his grandfather, the 1st duke, Viceroy of Naples (1582–1586). But this, as many other pieces of information, anecdotes, speeches and stories of Leti's biography are doubtful nowadays; the same happens with his alleged participation, in the royal expedition to Zaragoza to put down the Aragonese revolt in 1588 as by then he was only aged 13.

Pedro Téllez-Girón married on 17 January 1594 Catalina Enríquez de Ribera y Cortés In April 1594 he inherited the dukedom Afán de Ribera.

Although deeply indebted, the estate of Osuna came under the Council of Castile administration because of his young age, to avoid money mismanagements. The estate of Osuna was only second by total wealth in Spain to that of the Duke of Medina Sidonia.

In 1602, apparently with the agreement of Juan Fernández de Velasco, 5th Duke of Frías, Constable of Castile, his uncle and political godfather and one of the most powerful and outstanding personalities of the reign of King Philip III of Spain, Osuna escaped from his confinement in the castle of Cuéllar, a place/prison used for the last two centuries to control "illustrious" Crown guests accompanied by a servant, arriving in Brussels in October of that year.

Military career
Initially, he enlisted in the army of the Archduke Albert of Austria as a private, but soon he was given the command of two cavalry companies. In 1602 and 1603 he had a role in controlling and defusing the mutinies which erupted in Brabant among the armies of the Archduke, even financing the arrangements with the mutineers with his own money, raised in Flanders with the guarantee of his Spanish properties. Besides, he took part in several important battles, being seriously wounded twice.

Another of Leti's legends says that in 1604 he went to London, as a member of the embassy sent by king Philip III of Spain to king James I Stuart to sign the Treaty of Peace, the ambassador being the Constable of Castile, the later assessment being indeed true.

In 1608, when the negotiations for the 12 years truce between Maurice of Nassau and Ambrogio Spinola within the Eighty Years War had already begun in The Hague, he took no part as he was against them. He returned to Spain as a hero, being decorated in 1608 with the Order of the Golden Fleece, the highest decoration given by the King of Spain as head of the Habsburg dynasty.

In 1608 he arranged the marriage of his son, Juan, with the daughter of Cristóbal de Sandoval, Duke of Uceda, the son and assistant of Francisco Gómez de Sandoval y Rojas, Duke of Lerma, the Prime Minister and Valido of king Philip III of Spain. The political meaning of such an agreement was indeed that he was accepted as a member of the Lerma's family and group of friends, the real ruling elite of the Spanish monarchy at the time, till he was displaced around 1621 by his political enemy, Gaspar de Guzmán, Count-Duke of Olivares.

In Italy

As viceroy of Sicily
On 18 September 1610 he was named viceroy of Sicily, and took possession of his post at Milazzo on 9 March 1611. During his Sicilian viceroyalty he organized a squadron of galleys for the Royal Navy but also his own corsair fleet.

He launched several successful expeditions against Berber pirates and harbours, as well as against the Turks. In 1613 Ottavio d'Aragona the Younger was victorious in the Battle of Cape Corvo. In 1616, the commander of the royal Sicilian fleet, Francisco de Rivera y Medina, achieved another important victory against Turkish galleys in the Battle of Cape Celidonia. Overall, Osuna set up a sizable naval force in Sicily and reinforced the military might of the island.

As viceroy of Naples
In 1616 he was promoted to viceroy of Naples, and held the office until June 1620. The main problem for Spain in Italy was French and Savoyard ambitions on the Duchy of Milan, a key territory from the strategic point of view to maintain military communications between Spain and the Low Countries and other Habsburg territories in Europe.

Between 1613 and 1618 Spain and Savoy were actually at war, the former trying to contain the Duke of Savoy within the boundaries established after the Treaty of Cateau-Cambresis (1559), and the Duke, playing the role of Italian leader against foreign invaders (the Spaniards) trying by all means to enlarge his territories and, if possible, with French and Venetian help, to conquer Milan.  The main provider of financial help to Savoy was the Republic of Venice; Osuna considered that to end the Venetian dominion of the Adriatic gulf and even to conquer Venice itself was convenient and feasible.

In May 1618 the Venetian authorities claimed to have uncovered a very serious conspiracy to sack the city and burn the arsenal, summarily executing a number of alleged participants (all of them French) but insinuating that the real and secret heads of the plot were Osuna and the Spanish ambassador to Venice, Bedmar. The so-called "Conspiracy of the Spaniards against Venice of 1618" has been a question open to discussion among historians for the last four centuries. Spanish and German historians have a tendency to deny that the conspiracy was real or was serious enough; French and Italian historians have the opposite view.

The end of Osuna's government in Naples was very confused and tense. On the one hand, the nobility of Naples was increasingly hostile to Osuna, one of the main reasons being the economic burden imposed by the need to feed and lodge the big military force (12,000 soldiers) that Osuna had lodged in the city without the agreement of its representative bodies. On the other, because of Osuna's support to the political demands of the representatives of the low classes, "the people". In June 1620 the new temporary Viceroy, Cardinal Borja, former ambassador to Rome, took possession of the Viceroyalty against all formal rules, but Osuna accepted the authority of Borja and returned obediently to Madrid.

Fall and death
A few days after Philip III's death, in 1621, in a "purge" of the ministers of the new and very young king against Lerma's family and friends, Osuna was arrested by a decision of the State Council – the highest political and administrative body of the Spanish Monarchy – on a large and wide-ranging array of accusations (corruption, but also impiety, sexual misconduct, etc.). He remained under house arrest (imprisoned in castles or noble houses) until his death in September 1624. The purge was actively promoted by the new Royal PM, Gaspar de Guzmán, Count-Duke of Olivares.

No sentence was ever pronounced, but the House of Osuna was out of the royal favour for three decades, and only during the reign of Charles II did it again play an important role in Spanish political life.

See also
The Spanish Viceroy

Notes

References

External links

1574 births
1624 deaths
Viceroys of Naples
Viceroys of Sicily
103
102
107
Knights of the Golden Fleece
Pedro
Pedro
Grandees of Spain